The Knockout Stage of the 1996 Fed Cup Europe/Africa Zone Group I was the final stage of the Zonal Competition involving teams from Europe and Africa. Those that qualified for this stage placed first and second in their respective pools.

The eight teams were then randomly drawn into two two-stage knockout tournaments, with the winners advancing to the World Group II Play-offs.

Draw

Semifinals

Russia vs. Sweden

Hungary vs. Switzerland

Italy vs. Belarus

Croatia vs. Romania

Finals

Russia vs. Switzerland

Belarus vs. Croatia

See also
Fed Cup structure

References

External links
 Fed Cup website

1996 Fed Cup Europe/Africa Zone